Colorado Pride Switchbacks U23 is an American soccer club competing in USL League Two. It is a U-23 / developmental team operated jointly by Colorado Springs Switchbacks FC of the USL Championship and Pride Soccer Club academy, founded in 1994.

Year-by-year

Honors
USL League Two Mountain Division Champions 2019

Stadia
Washburn Field, Colorado Springs, Colorado (2018)
Weidner Field, Colorado Springs, Colorado (2018–present)

External links
Colorado Springs Switchbacks FC
Pride Soccer Club

References

USL League Two teams
2018 establishments in Colorado
Association football clubs established in 2018
Soccer clubs in Colorado